The Herero girdled lizard (Namazonurus pustulatus) is a species of lizard in the family Cordylidae. It is a small, spiny lizard found in Namibia.

References

Namazonurus
Reptiles of Namibia
Reptiles described in 1862
Taxa named by Wilhelm Peters